José Manuel Carriles Corino (born 12 May 1963) is a Spanish professional golfer.

Early life
Carriles was born in Pedreña in northern Spain, the birthplace of the late Seve Ballesteros. Like Ballesteros, he learned the game on the beach, where he and some friends shared a half set of clubs.

Golf was always in the blood, his father caddied at the local course and his mother also worked there. He was forbidden to play at the club except once a year in the caddies' competition, so as a youngster he used to climb the fence at the furthest point of the course for some secret practice.

Career
Carriles turned professional in 1983, and earned his European Tour card for the first time at the 1991 Qualifying School.

His best finish on the European Tour came in 1992, at the German Open where he finished runner-up, 11 strokes behind Vijay Singh. He finished the season 57th in the rankings.

Over the next 15 years he divided his time between the European Tour and the Challenge Tour, winning twice on the latter, the 1993 Estoril Challenge and the 2003 Challenge Tour Grand Final. He was also runner-up at the 2003 Izki Challenge de España, the 2006 Lexus Open and the Norwegian Challenge in 2006.

After finishing in third place at the 2013 Qualifying School Final, he joined the European Senior Tour. In 2015 he recorded three top-10 finishes, and clinched his first win in 2019 at the European Tour Destinations Senior Classic at PGA Catalunya Resort, Spain.

Professional wins (3)

Challenge Tour wins (2)

Challenge Tour playoff record (1–1)

European Senior Tour wins (1)

Results in major championships

CUT = missed the halfway cut
Note: Carriles only played in The Open Championship.

See also
2006 European Tour Qualifying School graduates

References

External links

Spanish male golfers
European Tour golfers
European Senior Tour golfers
People from Trasmiera
1963 births
Living people
20th-century Spanish people
21st-century Spanish people